The Slănic is a right tributary of the river Trotuș in Romania. It discharges into the Trotuș in Târgu Ocna.

References

Rivers of Romania
Rivers of Bacău County